High-yielding varieties (HYVs) of agricultural crops are usually characterized by a combination of the following traits in contrast to the conventional varieties:

 Higher crop yield per area (hectare)
 Dwarfness
 Improved response to fertilizers 
 High reliance on irrigation and fertilizers - see intensive farming
 Early maturation
 Resistive to many diseases
 Higher quality and quantity of crops can be produced.

Most important HYVs can be found among wheat, corn, soybean, rice, potato, and cotton. They are heavily used in commercial and plantation farms.

HYVs become popular in the 1960s and play an important role in the Green Revolution, although their ancestral roots can be older. HVYs are developed in the field of biotechnology.

See also
Genetic pollution

References

External links
https://lifeofplant.blogspot.de/2011/03/high-yield-crops.html

Agriculture
Crops